The 1991–92 Florida State Seminoles men's basketball team represented Florida State University as first-time members of the Atlantic Coast Conference during the 1991–92 NCAA Division I men's basketball season. Led by head coach Pat Kennedy, and future NBA players Sam Cassell, Doug Edwards, Bob Sura, and Charlie Ward, the Seminoles reached the Sweet Sixteen of the NCAA tournament. For the second consecutive season, Florida State was eliminated from NCAA Tournament play by a top five-ranked Indiana team. The team finished with an overall record of 22–10 (11–5 ACC).

Roster

Schedule

|-
!colspan=9 style=| Regular season
|-

|-
!colspan=9 style=| ACC Tournament
|-

|-
!colspan=9 style=| NCAA Tournament
|-

Rankings

Awards and honors
Sam Cassell – AP Honorable Mention All-American
Bob Sura – ACC Rookie of the Year
Pat Kennedy – ACC Coach of the Year

References

Florida State Seminoles men's basketball seasons
1991 in sports in Florida
1992 in sports in Florida
Florida State
Florida State